When We Rock, We Rock, and When We Roll, We Roll is a compilation album by Deep Purple featuring some of their most popular songs from 1968 to 1974.

When We Rock, We Rock, and When We Roll, We Roll was released in October 1978 by Warner Bros. Records. It was compiled by Dennis C. Nicklos in 1978 after the band originally split in 1976.

Track listing
All songs written by Blackmore/Gillan/Glover/Lord/Paice except where indicated.

Side one
 "Space Truckin'" – 4:31
 "Kentucky Woman" (Neil Diamond) – 4:44
 "Hard Road (Wring That Neck)" (Blackmore/Lord/Paice/Simper) – 5:11
 "Burn" (Blackmore/Lord/Paice/Coverdale) – 6:00

Side two
 "Woman from Tokyo" – 5:30 (Listed as a live recording, but is actually the studio version)
 "Hush" (Joe South) – 4:25
 "Smoke on the Water" – 6:27 (Live)
 "Highway Star" (Live) – 6:47

Credits
 Ian Gillan – lead vocals
 Ritchie Blackmore – guitar
 Jon Lord – organ, keyboards, backing vocals
 Roger Glover – bass guitar
 Ian Paice – drums
 Rod Evans – lead vocals on track 2 and 6
 Nick Simper – bass guitar and backing vocals on track 2, 3, 6
 David Coverdale – lead vocals on track 4
 Glenn Hughes – bass guitar and vocals on track 4

References 

1978 greatest hits albums
Albums produced by Derek Lawrence
Warner Records compilation albums
Deep Purple compilation albums
Albums with cover art by Shusei Nagaoka